Bubbenhall is a village and civil parish in the Warwick district of Warwickshire, England. 

According to the 2001 Census it had a population of 687, reducing to 655 at the 2011 Census. It has two pubs, The Three Horseshoes and The Malt Shovel and a sports field with a village hall. 

Just to the east of the village is Ryton Pools Country Park and to the south is Weston and Waverley Wood. Nearby villages include Ryton-on-Dunsmore, Stretton-on-Dunsmore, Baginton, Stoneleigh and Weston under Wetherley.

References

External links

Bubbenhall Parish Council Information Site

Villages in Warwickshire